The 2007–08 Liga II was the 68th season of the second tier of the Romanian football league system. The season began on 25 August 2007 and lasted until 24 May 2008.

The format has been maintained to two series, each of them consisting of 18 teams. At the end of the season, the top two teams of the series promoted to Liga I and the bottom fourth places from both series relegated to Liga III.

Team changes

To Liga II
Promoted from Liga III
 Unirea Focșani
 Dinamo II București
 Concordia Chiajna
 Severnav Drobeta-Turnu Severin
 Arieșul Turda
 Liberty Salonta
 Inter Gaz București
 Mureșul Deva

Relegated from Liga I
 Național București
 Argeș Pitești
 Jiul Petroșani

From Liga II
Relegated to Liga III
 Cetatea Suceava
 Building Vânju Mare
 FC Snagov
 Baia Mare
 Chimia Brazi
 Unirea Dej
 CF Brăila
 Auxerre Lugoj

Promoted to Liga I
 Universitatea Cluj
 Gloria Buzău
 Dacia Mioveni

Renamed teams
Național București was renamed as Progresul București.

Apulum Alba Iulia was renamed as Unirea Alba Iulia.

Unirea Focșani was renamed as CSM Focșani.

Severnav Drobeta-Turnu Severin was renamed as FC Drobeta-Turnu Severin.

League tables

Seria I

Seria II

Top scorers 
24 goals
  Attila Hadnagy (FC Brașov)

20 goals
  Claudiu Boaru (Gaz Metan Mediaș)

17 goals
  Marius Pena (Concordia Chiajna)

16 goals
  Kallé Soné (Otopeni)

14 goals
  Adrian Dulcea (Argeș Pitești)
  Robert Ilyes (FC Brașov)

12 goals
  Iulian Tameș (Argeș Pitești)

8 goals
  Costin Curelea (Sportul Studențesc)

6 goals
  Viorel Ferfelea (Sportul Studențesc)
  Daniel Costescu (Progresul București)

5 goals
  Alexandru Bourceanu (Dunărea Galați)
  Sorin Pană (Otopeni)
  Radu Neguț (Forex Brașov)
  Gabriel Apetri (Jiul Petroșani)

See also 

2007–08 Liga I
2007–08 Liga III

References 

Liga II seasons
Rom
2007–08 in Romanian football